Slovomir Vorobel (born October 26, 1971) is a Slovak former ice hockey defenceman.

Vorobel played in the Tipsport Liga for HC Košice, HK Dukla Trenčín, MHk 32 Liptovský Mikuláš and HK Poprad. He also played in the French Ligue Magnus for Anglet Hormadi Élite.

Vorobel played in the 1996 World Ice Hockey Championships for Slovakia.

Career statistics

References

External links

1971 births
Living people
Anglet Hormadi Élite players
Brest Albatros Hockey players
Drakkars de Caen players
HK Dukla Michalovce players
HK Dukla Trenčín players
HC Košice players
MHk 32 Liptovský Mikuláš players
HK Poprad players
HC Prešov players
Slovak ice hockey defencemen
Sportspeople from Košice